Brent Raymond Bowers (born May 2, 1971) is an American former professional baseball player. Bowers played in Major League Baseball as an outfielder for the Baltimore Orioles in the 1996 season. He also played in the Korea Baseball Organization in 1999. He batted left-handed and threw right-handed.

Career
Bowers was drafted by the Toronto Blue Jays in the second round of the 1989 Draft. In his lone major league season, in 21 games, he had 12 hits, six runs scored, in 39 at-bats, playing left field. He continued to play minor league baseball until 2002.

He served as the hitting coach for the Gary SouthShore RailCats of the Northern League from 2003 to 2004. He was the manager of the Windy City ThunderBolts of the Frontier League in 2005 and 2006. Most recently, Bowers was the field manager for the Edmonton Capitals of the Golden Baseball League. Bowers was suspended for the remainder of the season as a result of homophobic remarks made during a game on July 31, 2010. On August 7, 2010 he resigned from his position with the Edmonton Capitals.

Bowers now co-owns Triple Crown All-Stars, a baseball and softball academy in Schererville, Indiana.

References

External links
, or Korea Baseball Organization, or Retrosheet
Brent Bowers at Pura Pelota

1971 births
Living people
Albany-Colonie Diamond Dogs players
American expatriate baseball players in South Korea
Baltimore Orioles players
Baseball players from Chicago
Bowie Baysox players
Chattanooga Lookouts players
Duluth-Superior Dukes players
Dunedin Blue Jays players
Fargo-Moorhead RedHawks players
Gary SouthShore RailCats coaches
Hyundai Unicorns players
KBO League outfielders
Knoxville Smokies players
Major League Baseball left fielders
Medicine Hat Blue Jays players
Minor league baseball managers
Myrtle Beach Hurricanes players
New Jersey Jackals players
Norfolk Tides players
Pastora de los Llanos players
American expatriate baseball players in Venezuela
People from Bridgeview, Illinois
Rochester Red Wings players
Scranton/Wilkes-Barre Red Barons players
Sioux City Explorers players
Solano Steelheads players
Syracuse Chiefs players
West Tennessee Diamond Jaxx players